Rajesh Kumar Sharma (born 2 November 1978) is an Indian politician belonging to the Bharatiya Janata Party (BJP) 

His upcoming work includes Rangbaaz 3.

References
 

Living people
1978 births